The Amsterdam String Quartet was founded in 2000 by 4 international, specialist period instrument string players: Alida Schat and John Wilson Meyer (violin), Simon Murphy (viola), and Thomas Pitt (cello).

The quartet performs works by Haydn, Mozart and Beethoven, and their lesser known contemporaries.

The quartet has its own series in Amsterdam's Het Concertgebouw and has toured extensively.

The quartet has recorded several discs for Channel Classics.

Musical groups from Amsterdam
String quartets